Woodville is an unincorporated community in Lincoln County, West Virginia, United States. Woodville had a post office, which closed on April 27, 1991.

The community was named after a tract of woods near the original town site.

References

Unincorporated communities in Lincoln County, West Virginia
Unincorporated communities in West Virginia